Meris is a maker of 500 series modules and effects pedals. The company is based in Los Angeles and manufactures their products in the United States.

500 series 

Meris makes audio modules in the Automated Processes 500 series form factor, including a mic preamp, a reverb, and a decimation effect.

Pedals 

Meris also makes effects pedals, including an award-winning version of their 500 series reverb effect, as well as a pitch shifter, a delay, and a synthesizer.

In 2020 a reverb pedal created in collaboration with Chase Bliss was announced.

References

Bibliography 

 

Manufacturing companies based in Los Angeles
Electronics companies of the United States
Guitar effects manufacturing companies
Music equipment manufacturers